ISO 3166-2:NA is the entry for Namibia in ISO 3166-2, part of the ISO 3166 standard published by the International Organization for Standardization (ISO), which defines codes for the names of the principal subdivisions (e.g., provinces or states) of all countries coded in ISO 3166-1.

Currently for Namibia, ISO 3166-2 codes are defined for 14 regions.

Each code consists of two parts, separated by a hyphen. The second part is two letters.

The Kavango East and Kavango West regions were created in August 2013 by a split of Kavango Region (which was named Okavango before 1998). At the same time, Caprivi and Karas were renamed Zambezi and ǁKaras, respectively.

Current codes
Subdivision names are listed as in the ISO 3166-2 standard published by the ISO 3166 Maintenance Agency (ISO 3166/MA).

Click on the button in the header to sort each column.

Changes

The following changes to the entry are listed on ISO's online catalogue, the Online Browsing Platform:

See also
 Subdivisions of Namibia
 FIPS region codes of Namibia

External links
 ISO Online Browsing Platform: NA
 Regions of Namibia, Statoids.com

2:NA
ISO 3166-2
Namibia geography-related lists